"Freelove" is a song by English electronic group Depeche Mode. It was released on 5 November 2001 as the third single from their album Exciter.

The B-side is an instrumental called "Zenstation".

There is also a DVD release of "Freelove", a first for Depeche Mode. It contained video footage of "Freelove" from the Philadelphia concert in 2001, as well as audio of some of the other songs. It also contained four bonus 30-second videos of the band. The videos were directed by Anton Corbijn.

Music video
The music video for "Freelove" was directed by John Hillcoat and filmed in New Orleans, Louisiana in July 2001 while the group was on tour in the United States. The video features Depeche Mode performing on a parade float riding through a poor neighborhood. The impoverished residents follow the float and climb on it to dance. The video ends with the float and everybody disappearing, except for two people kissing. It has never been made available on a public release until the Video Singles Collection (2016).

Track listings

 All songs written by Martin Gore.

Charts

See also
 List of number-one dance singles of 2002 (U.S.)

References

External links
 Single information from the official Depeche Mode web site
 Allmusic review 

2001 singles
Depeche Mode songs
Songs written by Martin Gore
Music videos directed by Anton Corbijn
Mute Records singles
2000 songs